Jackson Township is a township in Monroe County, Arkansas, United States. Its total population was 121 as of the 2010 United States Census, a decrease of 45.50 percent from 222 at the 2000 census.

According to the 2010 Census, Jackson Township is located at  (34.522922, -91.182666).

References

External links 

Townships in Arkansas
Monroe County, Arkansas